Silvestro Chiesa (1623-1657) was an Italian painter of the Baroque period, active mainly in his natal city of Genoa. He was a pupil of Luciano Borzone. Died as a young man during the plague in 1657.

References

1657 deaths
17th-century Italian painters
Italian male painters
Painters from Genoa
Italian Baroque painters
17th-century deaths from plague (disease)
Year of birth unknown
1623 births